Mohamed Mustapha Ali Masfaka (born 1962), better known as Abu Ratib, is a Syrian Nasheed singer of Islamic and Arabic music based on classical Arab poetry.

Early life
Masfaka was born in Aleppo, Syria. From an early age, he was immersed in musical traditions of the Arab world. At a young age, he joined the Arab Music Institute in Aleppo, Syria where he studied musical notation (Solfège) and learned to play the violin. 

Masfaka studied broadcasting and television direction in Amman, Jordan, and obtained experience in the broadcasting engineering.

Career
As Masfaka balanced music with a growing interest in Islam, his work moved in a spiritual direction. He joined the band of the singer Abi Dujanah for religious singing, until he founded Al-Huda band in 1981 and began issuing the albums of Islamic singing. In 1986, Al-Huda band developed to found Al-Huda Islamic Art. In 1991, he founded Al-Huda International Art Production.

Masfaka is an active member of the Arabic arts community and is involved in numerous organizations to promote Islamic music and artist development worldwide. He has traveled over the U.S and abroad as a featured artist at community events in mosques and on college campuses.

He is a member of Michigan-based Crescent Academy International, and aims to overcome negative impressions of Islam through his works such as a play about the Islam featuring the Islamic prophet Muhammad which attracted a large non-Muslim audience. He is also head of the World Islamic Art League.

Masfaka has often sung in support of human rights for the occupied Palestinian people.

Awards
In 2006, Masfaka was awarded the World Youth Prize for Islamic Work in the field of Inshad (religious singing).

Arrest and deportation
In 2010, he was arrested when he returned from Canada, due to his involvement with the Holy Land Foundation when the case of the holy land 5 concluded in 2008 with their imprisonment. Masfaka who pleaded guilty to making false statements during his naturalization proceedings, was later deported to the country of his choice.

Personal life
Masfaka is married to Batoul Qaweqji and has five daughters, Ayah, Nour, Sana, Hiba, and Sama Masfaka.

See also
Syrian people
Music of Syria

References

External links

1962 births
Living people
Date of birth missing (living people)
Syrian Muslims
Syrian emigrants to the United States
20th-century Syrian male singers
Performers of Islamic music
People from Aleppo
Salahaddin University-Erbil alumni
University of Jordan alumni
Mohammed V University alumni
21st-century Syrian male singers